, also known as V.G., is a Japanese 2D fighting game / eroge series developed and published by TGL under their Giga brand. Their Giga brand was used for their home computer games while their TGL brand was used for their console games. The game series focuses on an all-female martial arts competition where participants are required to promote various family restaurants by acting as waitresses when not fighting. Takahiro Kimura was responsible for designing the characters in V.G. and V.G. II.

Plot
Set in a near-future version of Japan, the games tell the story of a martial arts tournament created to determine the country's strongest woman. The tournaments are sponsored by a number of family restaurants, who in exchange for their sponsorship, are given promotion in the form of having a tournament entry work as a waitress. As a result of the popularity of the tournaments, the restaurants experience a boom in patronage.

The winner of the tournament is awarded the title "Virgin Goddess", as well as a large cash prize of ten billion yen, and a house erected anywhere on the planet they should choose. However, when a given waitress is defeated, they are required to publicly strip themselves of their clothing (self-fondling and public masturbation may be forced upon the loser, and in the most extreme cases, the loser is raped/gang-raped, either in private or in front of an audience), in order to teach the so-called "true" shame of defeat. In spite of such humiliation, the tournaments often draw many competitors, each placing their pride and their dreams on the line as they battle for the top.

Characters

A practitioner of karate who resides in Tokyo. After her parents died when she was young, her grandfather took her in and trained her in the martial arts, including Karate and the manipulation of ki (life-energy). She enters the VG tournaments simply for the purpose of furthering her training and testing herself against strong opponents. Her virtuous, outgoing personality wins her many friends among the other fighters, among whom are Chiho Masuda, Jun Kubota, and Satomi Yajima, the latter of whom she has been best friends with for years. Apart of the main series, Yuka also appears in V.G. Neo as "Misty" and in Giga's crossover game Otome Crisis.

A trained ninja and was once the heir apparent to her family's ninja clan. However, she desires a life of freedom and happiness and thus has run away, becoming a "Missing-nin." She participates in hopes of using the prize money and free real estate to finance her new life.

A wrestler with vast amounts of strength, Jun once participated in the Olympics while in high school. However, she was ejected from the games due to repeated unsportsmanlike conduct. She later joins the V.G. competitions because she can treat her opponents as roughly as she pleases. Despite this however, Jun operates by her own personal honor code. She fiercely believes that the use of weaponry in an unarmed bout is unacceptable.

The youngest competitor in the VG Tournament at age 16. Along with her relative youth, she is also woefully immature, often acting like a girl half her age. Despite this however, she is a surprisingly clever and capable fighter, incorporating the natural energeticness of a child, as well her own vivid imagination into her fighting style. Her reason for entering the competitions is solely to obtain the large cash prize awarded to the winner. She is often the most lighthearted competitor in any given tournament, treating the fights as if they were all a big game.

A 19-year old computer technician schooled in the art of taekwondo. She initially entered the V.G. tournament to test her own abilities, but found herself humiliated in the final round by Reimi Jahana. Ever since, she has devoted her training to defeating the multi-time V.G. champion. Despite this, Kaori apparently bears no ill will towards her would-be rival and simply sees defeating her as part of the path she must travel to become stronger.

 is 
The head of the Jahana Group, the organization which supervises the V.G. tournaments. Reimi is wealthy, highly intelligent, and extremely beautiful. She is also a skilled martial artist and a three-time V.G. champion. Reimi initially sees the competitions as a chance to prove herself the strongest and most beautiful warrior of all, and takes a kind of perverse pleasure in watching those who lose against her be humiliated in various ways. After being defeated by Yuka, she reforms and re-enters the tournament with the hopes of regaining her title.

The first of Kotoe's bodyguards who specializes in Chinese martial arts. She would later reappear as a playable character in V.G. Max. She is first introduced in V.G. II: Bout of Cabalistic Goddess.

A young woman who lives with her younger brother, Daisuke. their parents died when they're young. She earns money for living expenses and school tuition by working part-time jobs while caring for Daisuke. While she is an honest, straightforward person, she is also practical and realistic when it comes to situations involving money. This is because they have no other living relatives to provide for them, Satomi is often forced to take various odd jobs simply in order to make ends meet.

The star attraction of the SoTO, a techno/rave dance club and restaurant, where she dazzles visitors with her flashy dancing. While appearing on the surface to be nothing more than a good-looking "Party girl", Ayako spends a great deal of her free time providing volunteer services to the needy and homeless. She also makes a pastime of luring out rapists, muggers, and stalkers and then beating them to within an inch of their lives, because they do unjust things to women.

Also known as Elirin, is a full-blooded American born and raised in Osaka. She is loud, outspoken, and fond of bawdy humor. She owns and operates her own restaurant, The Rival, and fights in the V.G. tournaments in hopes of bringing her paternal grandmother from the United States to live with her in Japan. Erina practices no particular martial art, but instead fights using improvised methods derived from years of street brawling which she took up to vent her anger at her treatment by others due to a kind of prejudice commonly shown by Japanese towards foreigners.

A young girl who dreams of one day being like her idol, Yuka Takeuchi. To that end, she has tirelessly spent her spare time practicing amateur Karate and attempting to copy Yuka's various techniques. She somehow gained the ability to control her energy before her fourteenth birthday. Much like Yuka, Tamao is hard working, honest, and generally outgoing, which allows her to make friends easily. However, she is clumsy, forgetful, and tends to act before thinking things through.

A member of one of the Masuda clan's branch families and Chiho's distant cousin. She is sent to compete under orders to either force Chiho back into the clan or kill her.

Media

Games

Anime

There is a three-part anime OVA series based on the games. The OVA loosely follows the same plot as Advanced V.G., although with several facts changed: Miranda is dead and her spirit is seeking a new host body, the Hybrids do not exist, and the matches are ranked at different "levels" (Levels 1–5, with the implication that the penalties for losing differ, depending on the level of a given match), among other things. The voice actors for every character was changed for this series.

On November 29, 1996, KSS released the first chapter of the OVA. The second chapter was released on March 14, 1997 and the last chapter was released on June 27, 1997. In 1998 ADV Films released the animation subtitled and dubbed on VHS, and later re-released in 2003 on DVD, as part of the celebration of the 10th Variable Geo Anniversary. Also, a new OVA series was released in Japan during 2004 called Variable Geo Neo (or V.G. NEO) released by Milky Studios, based in the new Giga game for the 10th Variable Geo Anniversary, with new characters but with the same storyline and in the same VG universe. Unlike the previous OVA, V.G. NEO contains sexually explicit content in line with the game series.

Gameplay
Gameplay in Variable Geo utilizes a four-button layout, with two buttons each for punches and kicks of differing strength and speed. Special moves are initiated by keying in various movements using the control pad or joystick and punctuated with the press of one of the punch or kick buttons.

Later games would add a special meter that would fill as the player inflicts or receives damage. Filling the bar would result in a stock of "Energy" being acquired, which could either be used for one of a number of enhanced super special attacks, or saved for later use in the match. Some moves also require more than one Special Stock to be acquired before being able to use them.

Both characters begin any given fight with a full health bar that is depleted as they take damage from attacks. The first character to have her health completely depleted is the loser. In a single player game, defeating a CPU-controlled character yields a reward, showcasing the defeated character in an imaginary situation where she is either forced to commit an embarrassing (usually sexual) act in public or private, or is raped by an unseen assailant or assailants.

Reception
 Writing in Viz Media's online magazine, Ted Thomas reviewed Advanced VG and recommended that the game is not worth importing. J-pop reviewed the series, noting that the series includes various lesbian characters, along with themes about "DNA manipulation, demonic possession, mind control, and body altering drugs." The review also said that the animation is sparse and said that while they enjoyed the series, it is "full of all the guilty pleasures only anime can provide."

References

External links
  Giga's official VG NEO website (also contains info about V.G. series and its 10th anniversary)
  V.G. C.D.A.
  Success's Advanced V.G. official website
  Success's Advanced V.G. 2 official website
 Milky Animation Label Homepage; 
 Giga's Official Variable Geo Neo Page
 
 

 
1993 video games
Bishōjo games
DOS games
Eroge
Fighting games
Japan-exclusive video games
PlayStation (console) games
Rape in fiction
Sega Saturn games
Super Nintendo Entertainment System games
TurboGrafx-CD games
Video games developed in Japan
Video games featuring female protagonists
Visual novels
Windows games